The 1953 municipal election was held October 14, 1953, to elect six aldermen to sit on Edmonton City Council and four trustees to sit on the separate school board, while the mayor and four trustees for the public school board were acclaimed.  The electorate also decided five plebiscite questions.

There were ten aldermen on city council, but four of the positions were already filled:
Edwin Clarke, James MacDonald, Frederick John Mitchell, and Ethel Wilson were all elected to two-year terms in 1952 and were still in office.  Richmond Francis Hanna (SS) had also been elected to a two-year term in 1952, but had been elected to the House of Commons of Canada and had resigned; consequently, Hu Harries (SS) was elected alderman for a one-year term to complete his term.

There were seven trustees on the public school board, but three of the positions were already filled: Charles Cummins, Robert Rae, and Harry Fowler had been acclaimed to two-year terms in 1952 and were still in office.  The same was true on the separate board, where Francis Killeen, James O'Hara, and Adrian Crowe (SS) were continuing.

Voter turnout

There were 12,146 ballots cast out of 107,687 eligible voters, for a voter turnout of 11.2%.

Results

 bold or  indicates elected
 italics indicate incumbent
 "SS", where data is available, indicates representative for Edmonton's South Side, with a minimum South Side representation instituted after the city of Strathcona, south of the North Saskatchewan River, amalgamated into Edmonton on February 1, 1912.

Mayor

Aldermen

Public school trustees

Separate (Catholic) school trustees

Plebiscites

 Financial plebiscite items required a minimum two-thirds "Yes" majority to bring about action

Paving

Shall Council pass a bylaw creating a debenture debt in the sum of $1,250,000 for the City share of paving arterial and residential streets?
Yes - 8,271
No - 757

Engineering Equipment

Shall Council pass a bylaw creating a debenture debt in the sum of $200,000 for the purpose of buying Engineers Department Equipment, consisting of scavenging equipment, oil distributor, front end loaders, oil and gas tenders, sweepers and other construction equipment?
Yes - 7,720
No - 1,090

Swimming Pool Renovations

Shall Council pass a bylaw creating a debenture debt in the sum of $75,000 for providing new filtration system and reconstructing dressing rooms and sun deck area in Borden Park Swimming Pool?
Yes - 6,413
No - 2,067

Playgrounds

Shall Council pass a bylaw creating a debenture debt in the sum of $50,000 to develop public playgrounds, playground shelters, wading pools and to provide other public recreation facilities?
Yes - 7,410
No - 1,270

New Building at the Royal Alexandra Hospital

Shall Council pass a bylaw creating a debenture debt in the sum of $355,000 being part of the cost of construction of a building to contain kitchen and dining room, storage and other facilities, at the Royal Alexandra Hospital?
Yes - 7,299
No - 1,439

References

Election History, City of Edmonton: Elections and Census Office

1953
1953 elections in Canada
1953 in Alberta